Peter Wayne Goode Jr. (August 20, 1937 – October 3, 2020) was an American politician in the state of Missouri. He was born in St. Louis. He attended the University of Missouri in Columbia and earned a degree in finance and banking. He was a former officer of the United States Army Reserve. Goode was elected to the Missouri House of Representatives for district 33 in 1962 and was a Democrat. He served until 1984, when he was elected to the Missouri State Senate. he served in the senate until 2005.  He died of leukemia on October 3, 2020, in St. Louis at the age of 83.

References

1937 births
2020 deaths
Deaths from cancer in Missouri
Deaths from leukemia
Politicians from St. Louis
Military personnel from St. Louis
Democratic Party Missouri state senators
Democratic Party members of the Missouri House of Representatives
University of Missouri alumni
University of Missouri–St. Louis people